Snowshoe Lake is a lake in the Lake Huron drainage basin  northeast of the community of Burton and the Canadian National Railway line in Whitestone, Parry Sound District, Ontario, Canada. The lake drains via unnamed creek to Doctor Lake and into the South Branch of the Magnetawan River, and then either through the Magnetawan, or Harris and Naiscoot Rivers into Lake Huron.

See also
List of lakes in Ontario

References

Lakes of Parry Sound District